

List of Ambassadors

Meron Reuben 2002-2004
Isaac Bachman 1998 - 2001
Yair Recanati 1995 - 1997
Yaacov Brakha 1990 - 1991
Meir Halifa 1988 - 1990
Nissim Itzhak 1986 - 1987
Berl Zerubavel 1984 - 1986
Arie Avidor 1981 - 1984
Shlomo Levy 1978 - 1981
Mordechai Palzur 1975 - 1978
Samuel Hadas 1971 - 1975
Moshe Yuval (Non-Resident, Lima) 1967 - 1971
Michael Simon (diplomat) (Non-Resident, Lima) 1960 - 1963
Tuvia Arazi (Non-Resident, Lima) 1956 - 1960

References 

Bolivia
Israel